Atmore is a city in Escambia County, Alabama, United States. It was incorporated in 1907. As of the 2020 census, it has a population of 8,391. Atmore is in the planning stages to increase its economic base with additions in its new Rivercane development along the I-65 corridor.

Atmore has completed requirements to be recognized as an Alabama Community of Excellence at the upcoming Alabama League of Municipalities Convention. City officials are also working with the Alabama Historical Commission to have the downtown district listed on the National Register of Historic Places.

On May 23, 2007, Atmore celebrated its centenary.

The federally recognized Poarch Band of Creek Indians is headquartered in Atmore.

History
Atmore was first recorded as a stop (Williams Station) on the Mobile and Great Northern Railroad. The town was originally going to be named "Carney", in honor of a prominent citizen who owned a sawmill in town. However, Mr. Carney had a brother who had already established a town nearby with the same name. he town then decided to let Mr. Carney name the town. He named it after his close friend C.P. Atmore, General Passenger Agent of the Louisville and Nashville Railroad. Despite it being named in his honor, Mr. Atmore never visited the town.

In 2008 the city of Atmore annexed Alabama Department of Corrections prison property, including Holman Correctional Facility and Fountain Correctional Facility. The Alabama DOC asked for the city to annex the land.

Geography
Atmore is located in western Escambia County at  (31.023183, -87.492067). Its southern border is the Florida state line. The center of town is at the intersection of U.S. Route 31 and Alabama State Route 21, while a new section of the city has been incorporated  to the north around Exit 57 of Interstate 65. US 31 leads southwest  to Bay Minette and east  to Brewton.

Demographics

Atmore first appeared on the 1910 U.S. Census as an incorporated town. By 1930, it became the largest city in Escambia County, though lost the title to former holder Brewton in 1940. It became the largest city again in 1950 and has held the distinction to date (2010). In 2010, the city became majority Black for the first time.

2020 census

As of the 2020 United States census, there were 8,391 people, 2,803 households, and 1,443 families residing in the city.

2010 census
The racial makeup of the city was 55.4% Black or African American, 39.3% White, 1.8% Native American, 0.3% Asian, 0.1% Pacific Islander, 0.1% from other races, and 1.3% from two or more races. 1.8% of the population were Hispanic or Latino of any race.

There were 3,002 households, out of which 26.1% had children under the age of 18 living with them, 34.9% were married couples living together, 23.1% had a female householder with no husband present, and 37.1% were non-families. 33.4% of all households were made up of individuals, and 14.4% had someone living alone who was 65 years of age or older. The average household size was 2.43 and the average family size was 3.09.

In the city, the population was spread out, with 18.6% under the age of 18, 9.1% from 18 to 24, 34.5% from 25 to 44, 24.9% from 45 to 64, and 12.9% who were 65 years of age or older. The median age was 37.4 years. For every 100 females, there were 155.5 males. For every 100 females age 18 and over, there were 207.4 males.

Atmore Census Division (1960-)

Atmore was created a census division in 1960 following the general reorganization of county precincts. Prior to 1960, Atmore was within the former Escambia County 7th precinct of Canoe.

Education
Escambia County Public School System is the public school district of Atmore. Schools in Atmore include: Rachel Patterson Elementary School, Escambia County Middle School (the largest school in the system), and Escambia County High School (the first public county high school in the state of Alabama).

It is also home to Atmore Christian School, as well as several other private schools and colleges including Reid state. Escambia Academy has at Atmore address but is not in the city limits. Prior to 1970, African-American children were not allowed to attend schools with white children, and attended black schools such as the Escambia County Training School in Atmore.

Atmore is home to an adjunct campus of Coastal Alabama Community College Brewton based in Brewton, which offers associate degrees and technical school training.

Government and infrastructure
Atmore is governed by a mayor and members of a city council elected from five districts within the city.

Holman has a male death row and the State of Alabama execution chamber.

Local economy
For most of the 20th century, the Atmore area was primarily a farming, timber, and light industry community. Major commercial industries have been Masland Carpets, Alto, and a local lumber company. For many years, the Vanity Fair lingerie company operated a manufacturing sewing plant in Atmore, offering employment to local citizens and surrounding communities.

The tribe operates the Wind Creek Casino and Hotel, which provides for tourism and conferences, adjacent to I-65 Exit 57. Wind Creek is one of just a few four-diamond hotels in the state.

Transportation
Atmore is close to Interstate 65 (to the north). US Highway 31 and Alabama Highway 21 pass through the center of the city. 

In addition, the town is home to Atmore Municipal Airport with a 4,952 foot long runway.

The town is serviced by two freight railroads, the Alabama and Gulf Coast Railway and CSX. Historically, Atmore was home to a Frisco Railway station, served by a section of the railroad's Sunnyland passenger train north to Tupelo, Mississippi and Memphis, Tennessee, and south to Pensacola, Florida. A Louisville and Nashville station was a stop for the Azalean (Cincinnati-New Orleans), the Piedmont Limited (New York-New Orleans) and local Montgomery-New Orleans trains. The Frisco service ended in 1955, and the L&N in 1971. Atmore station was later served by Amtrak's Gulf Breeze train (Birmingham-Montgomery-Mobile) until that service ended in 1995.

Health care and recreation
Atmore Community Hospital, an affiliate of Infirmary Health Systems of Mobile, offers full acute care in a two-story facility.

Atmore has several recreational and sports facilities, including Atmore Heritage Park and Claude D. Kelley State Park.

Local events
Mayfest — On the first Saturday in May at Tom Byrne Park, Atmore celebrates Mayfest with sports events, arts and crafts and a variety of food. There are many different forms of entertainment, including a Beautiful Baby Contest and a Pooch Parade.

Old-Time Fiddlers' Convention — Musicians from across the state come to Atmore the third Saturday in July to compete for prizes in the fiddle, guitar, banjo, mandolin, and bands and vocals division.

A Taste of the South — Held annually at Heritage Park in September, A Taste of the South is an evening of entertainment and local food from the area's best cooks.

Williams Station Day — Held the fourth Saturday of October, Williams Station Day celebrates Atmore's history beginning in 1866 as Williams Station. The event includes an arts and crafts show, an old time fiddlers' tent, professional entertainment, a model train show, and sugar cane mill.

Poarch Creek Indian Pow-wow — The local Poarch Creek Indians host an authentic Thanksgiving annually. Visitors enjoy turkey, dressing, and roasted corn as dancers from many tribes gather to compete. Over 100 booths display arts and crafts, quilts and other keepsakes of the Creek Indian culture.

Notable people

 Paul Birch, actor and the original "Marlboro Man", born in Atmore
 Bobby Brantley, 13th lieutenant governor of Florida
 Marva Collins, American educator
 Paul Crawford, jazz musician, music historian, and music arranger
 Glenn L. Emmons, commissioner of the Bureau of Indian Affairs from 1953 to 1961, native of Atmore
 Steven C. Harris, Commercial pilot for FedEx Corporation from 1984 until his retirement in 2010, native of Atmore
 Evander Holyfield, four-time world heavyweight boxing champion, born in Atmore
 William C. Maxwell, namesake of Maxwell Air Force Base
 Dr. Ulysses McBride, Past President of Bishop State Community College and Reid State Technical College
 Don McNeal, star defensive back for Alabama and the Miami Dolphins, born and raised in Atmore
 Ron Middleton, former Auburn University and NFL tight end
 Woodrow McClain Parker, Professor Emeritus, mental health counselor, and author
 Michael Williams, NFL player

 Art White, WWII Veteran, Alabama Sports Hall of Fame, world heavyweight championship wrestler, former University of Alabama All-American, member of 1934 National Championship team, played alongside Paul "Bear" Bryant and Don Hutson, and NFL offensive guard player, 1938 NFL Championship winner, 1938 Pro Bowl

Climate
Climate is characterized by mild to high temperatures and evenly distributed precipitation throughout the year. The Köppen Climate Classification sub-type for this climate is "Cfa" (Humid Subtropical Climate).

Photo Gallery

References

External links

 City of Atmore official website
 Atmore Area Chamber of Commerce
 The Poarch Band of Creek Indians

Cities in Alabama
Cities in Escambia County, Alabama
1907 establishments in Alabama
Populated places established in 1907
Poarch Band of Creek Indians